This is a list of seasons completed by the Drake Bulldogs football team of the National Collegiate Athletic Association (NCAA) Division I Football Championship Subdivision (FCS).
The Drake fielded their first team in 1893 without a coach and are currently coached by Todd Stepsis. The 1986 season was exhibition only.

Seasons

Bowl results

Notes

Drake
 
Drake Bulldogs football seasons